L'Arche is a Jewish news magazine in France. The magazine was started in 1950 and is published on a monthly basis. It is headquartered in Paris. Its contributors include Michel Gurfinkiel.

References

External links

1950 establishments in France
French-language magazines
Jewish magazines
Magazines established in 1950
Magazines published in Paris
Monthly magazines published in France
News magazines published in France